Cilia Sawadogo (born 1965), is a Canadian-Burkinabé-German filmmaker.

Biography 
Born in Leipzig in 1965 to a Burkinabé father and German mother, Sawadogo began studying animation techniques at Concordia University in Montreal, graduating in 1989 with a BA in communication studies and a minor in film animation. After graduating, she began to animate and make films professionally, first working on several animations for the American children's show Sesame Street from 1992-1993. In 1993, her first major work, La femme mariée à trios hommes (The woman with three husbands), was released and received several awards. Throughout the 1990s, she worked on numerous short animated films in collaboration with the National Film Board of Canada, and in 1995 she assisted with the film Jonas et Lisa. She is currently an associate professor of cinema at Concordia University and continues to produce animations, posters, and book illustrations.

Filmography 
The following is a list of short films by Sawadogo.

References

1965 births
Canadian women animators
Film directors from Montreal
German people of Burkinabé descent
Living people
German emigrants to Canada
Academic staff of Concordia University
Canadian animators
Canadian people of Burkinabé descent
Black Canadian filmmakers
German women animators